Rubén Maidana (12 January 1923 – 8 October 2015) was an Argentine former water polo player who competed in the 1948 Summer Olympics and was in the squad for the 1952 Summer Olympics but did not play.

References

External links
 

1923 births
2015 deaths
Argentine male water polo players
Olympic water polo players of Argentina
Water polo players at the 1948 Summer Olympics